Edward Columbus Hosford, also known as Edward C. Hosford and E. C.  Hosford, (April 24, 1883 – January 2, 1939) was an American architect noted for the  courthouses and other buildings that he  designed in Florida, Georgia and Texas.

Early life
Edward Columbus Hosford was born in Eastman, Georgia, the son of Christopher Columbus Hosford and his wife, Hattie B. Pipkin Hosford. Little is known of his early life and education. His Dodge County draft registration card in 1918 shows that he was a "draftsman & estimator" for "Hugger Bros." [Construction Company] of Brunswick, Georgia.

Marriage and family
Edward Columbus Hosford married Alice Mae Baker. Their children included: Evelyn Elvira Hosford (1911-1925) and Mildred Elizabeth (Hosford) Dumich (1915-1989).

County courthouses
Edward Columbus Hosford designed many county courthouses, including the following:

Florida

Georgia

Texas

Other buildings
Other buildings designed by Hosford include:

References

External links

 Florida's Historic Courthouses

1883 births
1939 deaths
20th-century American architects
 
People from Eastman, Georgia
Architects from Georgia (U.S. state)